"Love to Say Dada" (also known as "I Love to Say Da Da", "Da Da", and "All Day") is an unfinished song that was written by American musician Brian Wilson for the Beach Boys' Smile project. It spells LSD in its initials and was one of the last tracks recorded for the album. The song subsequently evolved into "Cool, Cool Water" from Sunflower (1970).

In 2003, Wilson rewrote "Love to Say Dada" as "In Blue Hawaii" with new lyrics by Van Dyke Parks for Brian Wilson Presents Smile (2004). The Beach Boys' original recording of "Love to Say Dada" was released on the compilations Good Vibrations: Thirty Years of the Beach Boys (1993) and The Smile Sessions (2011). The latter release mixed elements from "Cool, Cool Water" into the track.

Background
Wilson's first wife Marilyn wrote in the liner notes of The Smile Sessions: "When he was writing Love to Say Dada he had me buy him a baby bottle and fill it with chocolate milk, and he would sit and write and drink from it. It was hilarious, I thought." Stephen Desper, who became the band's engineer in late 1967, wrote in 2012 that "Love to Say Dada" was "a song about a baby ... It was never finished or released. "

Music historian Bill Tobelman noted that the song's title could be abbreviated as "LSD", a reference to the drug. Biographer Byron Preiss wrote that the song formed part of the water-themed section of "The Elements" and was "briefly considered" to be paired with "Surf's Up".

Recording
On December 22, 1966, Wilson recorded two versions of the track, titled "Da Da", at Columbia Studio. One version featured him playing a piano with the strings taped, while the other featured him playing a Fender Rhodes electric piano. No master number was assigned to the tape. "Heroes and Villains: All Day" was recorded on January 27, 1967.

From May 16 to 18, 1967, Wilson produced three sessions dedicated to the track at Gold Star Studios. Another session scheduled for May 19 that would have likely seen further work on the track was cancelled. The session would have employed the musicians Mike Rubini, Bill Pitman, Lyle Ritz, drummers Hal Blaine and Jim Gordon, and percussionist Alan Estes. According to music historian Keith Badman, these occasions marked the final sessions for the Smile album.

"Cool, Cool Water"
"Love to Say Dada" later evolved into the song "Cool, Cool Water". The "Cool Cool Water Chant", which appears as an introduction to The Smile Sessions'' version of "Love to Say Dada", was recorded in October 1967. Vocals recorded by Carl Wilson for "Cool, Cool Water" on October 29, 1967 were also combined with this version.

Personnel
Per band archivist Craig Slowinski.

Part 1 (May 16, 1967)

 Hal Blaine – drums
 Gene Estes – upright piano
 Mike Rubini – grand piano
 Bill Pitman – Danelectro bass
 Lyle Ritz – upright bass
 Brian Wilson – temple blocks

Part 2 (May 17, 1967)

 Hal Blaine – drums
 Gene Estes – Hammond organ
 Jim  Horn – clarinet
 Carol Kaye – electric rhythm guitar (uncertain credit)
 Jay Migliori – clarinet
 Bill Pitman – Danelectro bass (uncertain credit)
 Ray Pohlman – 12-string electric lead guitar (uncertain credit)
 Lyle Ritz – Fender bass (uncertain credit)
 Mike Rubini – grand piano
 Brian Wilson – vocals, temple blocks

Part 2 (Second Day) (May 18, 1967) 

 Frank DeVito – bongos
 Gene Estes – Hammond organ
 Bill Green – piccolo, whistle
 Jay Migliori – piccolo, whistle
 Bill Pitman – "gut-string" guitar
 Ray Pohlman – Danelectro bass
 Mel Pollan – upright bass
 Mike Rubini – grand piano
 Brian Wilson – piano with taped strings

References

External links
 
 
 
 
 
 
 

2004 songs
The Beach Boys songs
Songs written by Brian Wilson
Songs written by Van Dyke Parks
Song recordings produced by Brian Wilson
Songs about drugs